John Rea may refer to:

 John Rea (horticulturalist) (died 1681), English garden writer
 John Rea (politician) (1755–1829), United States politician
 John Rea (Florida politician), an early mayor of Tallahassee, Florida

 John Patterson Rea (1840–1900), Minnesota judge
 John Andrew Rea (1848–1941), American journalist and politician
 John Huntington Rea (1909–1968), American actor better known by the stage name John Ridgely
 John Joseph Rea (1921–2013), Northern Irish snooker player, better known as Jackie Rea
 John Rea (papyrologist) (born 1933), British papyrologist and academic
 John Rea (composer) (born 1944), Canadian classical music composer
 John Rea (snooker player) (born 1951), Scottish snooker player
 John Rea (musician), Irish hammered dulcimer player
 John Rea (artistic director) (born 1967), American composer and artistic director
 John Rea (footballer) (1868–1944), Welsh footballer
 Johnny Rea, motorcycle racer